Crawford is a small town in Lowndes County, Mississippi, United States. The population was 641 at the 2010 census.
During the 1840s, a Baptist minister named Peter Crawford lived in the area. When the town was platted in 1852, it was named Crawfordsville. This name was used until 1870, when it was shortened to Crawfordville. Finally in 1879 it was changed to Crawford.

The Mobile and Ohio Railroad came though Crawfordsville in 1857.

Geography

Crawford is located at  (33.306205, -88.621933).

Demographics

As of the 2010 United States Census, there were 641 people in the town. 89.9% were African American, 8.0% White, 0.6% Native American and 1.6% of two or more races. 0.6% were Hispanic or Latino of any race.

As of the 2000 United States Census there were 655 people, 209 households, and 163 families in the town. The population density was 466.7 people per square mile (180.6/km²). There were 251 housing units at an average density of 178.9 per square mile (69.2/km²). The racial makeup of the town was 93.13% African American, 5.95% White, 0.31% Native American, 0.15% from other races, and 0.46% from two or more races. Hispanic or Latino of any race were 0.61% of the population.

There were 309 households, out of which 45.0% had children under the age of 18 living with them, 31.6% were married couples living together, 42.1% had a female householder with no husband present, and 22.0% were non-families. 20.6% of all households were made up of individuals, and 7.7% had someone living alone who was 65 years of age or older. The average household size was 3.13 and the average family size was 3.67.

The town population contained 41.5% under the age of 18, 9.0% from 18 to 24, 25.6% from 25 to 44, 17.1% from 45 to 64, and 6.7% who were 65 years of age or older. The median age was 24 years. For every 100 females, there were 75.1 males. For every 100 females age 18 and over, there were 67.2 males.

The median income for a household in the town was $16,786, and the median income for a family was $16,058. Males had a median income of $24,107 versus $14,359 for females. The per capita income for the town was $7,123. About 45.5% of families and 45.7% of the population are below the poverty line, including 60.5% of those under age 18 and 35.3% of those age 65 or over.

Education
The Town of Crawford is served by the Lowndes County School District.

Notable people
 Sam Hairston, former Negro league baseball and MLB player
 Jerry Rice, NFL first ballot Hall of Fame wide receiver
 Don "Cadillac Don" Sharp, rap/hip-hop artist
 Clarence Weatherspoon, NBA player
 Big Joe Williams, Mississippi Musicians Hall of Fame blues singer and guitarist; born in Crawford in 1903

References

See also
 Crawford City Hall (contact information)
 Hairston: History of Crawford, Lowndes County, Mississippi

Towns in Lowndes County, Mississippi
Towns in Mississippi